Onur Balkan (born 10 March 1996) is a Turkish cyclist, who currently rides for UCI Continental team .

Doping
On 11 May 2022 Balkan returned an adverse analytical sample for EPO and was provisionally suspended.

Major results

2013
 National Junior Road Championships
1st  Road race
1st  Time trial
2014
 National Junior Road Championships
1st  Road race
2nd Time trial
2015
 Tour of Ankara
1st  Points classification
1st Stages 2 & 3
 2nd Overall Tour of Black Sea
1st  Points classification
1st Stage 2
 3rd Overall Tour of Çanakkale
1st  Points classification
1st Stage 1
 4th Overall Tour of Mersin
1st Stage 2
 5th Time trial, National Road Championships
 6th Overall Tour of Aegean
1st Stage 2
 8th Overall International Tour of Torku Mevlana
1st  Mountains classification
2016
 National Road Championships
1st  Road race
5th Time trial
 1st Stage 2 Tour du Maroc
2017
 National Road Championships
1st  Road race
3rd Time trial
 1st  Turkish Beauties classification Presidential Tour of Turkey
2018
 National Road Championships
1st  Road race
7th Time trial
 1st  Overall Tour of Mediterrennean
1st Stages 2 & 3
 1st  Overall Tour of Mevlana
 1st  Turkish Beauties classification Presidential Tour of Turkey
 1st Stage 9 Tour of Qinghai Lake
 1st Stage 3 Tour of Cappadocia
 2nd Overall Tour of Cartier
1st  Points classification
 2nd Overall Tour of Romania
1st Young rider classification
1st Stage 5
 2nd Grand Prix Alanya
 5th Overall Tour of Mesopotamia
1st  Points classification
1st Stage 4
 5th Overall Tour of Mersin
2019
 1st  Overall Tour of Black Sea
1st  Points classification
1st Stages 2 & 3
 1st  Overall Tour of Kayseri
1st Stage 2
 1st Grand Prix Justiniano Hotels
 1st Tour de Ribas
 1st Bursa Orhangazi Race
 1st Grand Prix Velo Erciyes
 1st Fatih Sultan Mehmet Edirne Race
 1st Stage 3 Tour of Mesopotamia
 National Road Championships
2nd Road race
2nd Time trial
 2nd Overall Tour of Central Anatolia
1st Stage 2
 2nd Minsk Cup
 2nd Grand Prix Erciyes
 2nd Grand Prix Velo Alanya
 3rd Overall Tour of Mevlana
 3rd Bursa Yıldırım Bayezıt Race
 5th Horizon Park Race for Peace
 7th Grand Prix Alanya
 7th Fatih Sultan Mehmet Kirklareli Race
 9th Overall Tour de Tochigi
2020
 1st  Road race, National Road Championships
 2nd GP Belek
 3rd Grand Prix Alanya
 3rd GP Manavgat
 5th GP Antalya
2021
 1st  Road race, National Road Championships
 1st GP Mediterrennean
 5th GP Manavgat
2022
 1st Grand Prix Gazipaşa
 1st Stage 5 Tour of Sharjah
 5th Grand Prix Justiniano Hotels

References

External links

1996 births
Living people
Turkish male cyclists
Olympic cyclists of Turkey
Cyclists at the 2016 Summer Olympics
Cyclists at the 2020 Summer Olympics
Competitors at the 2018 Mediterranean Games
European Games competitors for Turkey
Cyclists at the 2015 European Games
Cyclists at the 2019 European Games
Mediterranean Games competitors for Turkey
Sportspeople from İzmit
20th-century Turkish people
21st-century Turkish people